A Million Bid may refer to:
 A Million Bid (1914 film)
 A Million Bid (1927 film)